Malia M. Cohen (born December 16, 1977) is an American politician serving as the California State Controller following the 2022 election. A member of the Democratic Party, Cohen previously served as the Chair of the California California State Board of Equalization from the 2nd district, which covers 23 counties in California and a population of approximately 9.5 million people, and as President of the San Francisco Board of Supervisors, representing District 10.

Early life and education 
Cohen grew up the eldest of five girls in the Richmond District in San Francisco and graduated from Lowell High School. Her mother was a social worker and her father a telecommunication worker. Cohen later moved to Portola neighborhood before buying a condominium in the Bayview neighborhood by Candlestick Park in 2006. The condo was foreclosed before 2010 following the 2007–2008 financial crisis.

Cohen earned a bachelor's degree in political science from Fisk University and a graduate degree in political science from Carnegie Mellon University.

Career 
Cohen worked as a field organizer for Gavin Newsom in the 2003 San Francisco mayoral election and as his confidential secretary for two years when he was mayor. After the Mayor's Office, Cohen worked as a legislative aide for San Mateo Supervisor Rose Jacobs Gibson.

In the 2010 election for District 10 of the San Francisco Board of Supervisors, she initially finished third out of a field of 22, but eventually won the election based on ranked choice voting.

In October 2013, Cohen introduced legislation that expanded an existing San Francisco law making it illegal to sell firearms with magazines capable of holding more than 10 rounds. The gun-control legislation passed unanimously.

In 2013, Cohen and Jane Kim authored the Fair Chance ordinance, a "ban the box" legislation barring employers and landlords from asking applicants to state their criminal history on applications, which passed the Board of Supervisors unanimously.

In 2014, Cohen was re-elected for a second term to represent District 10 after being challenged by Marlene Tran and Tony Kelly.

In 2015, Cohen publicly defended San Francisco's sanctuary city laws, which drew the attention of Fox News Host Bill O'Reilly. After the shooting death of Kathryn Steinle by an illegal alien, O'Reilly had been critical of San Francisco and its elected officials. O'Reilly said that Cohen should be placed under arrest for her comments defending San Francisco's sanctuary city policy.

In 2016, Cohen introduced legislation, in reaction to lobbying by sitting judges, that could result in pension boosts for some of those judges or for other individuals who become judges after working for the city government. The San Francisco Examiner reported that according to analysis by the San Francisco Employees Retirement System (SFERS), the proposal would increase the pensions of four current judges, with an average expected additional lifetime benefit of $147,000 per judge affected. The SFERS report did not name those judges, and SFERS spokesman Norm Nickens said the agency does not release the names of active members.

Cohen succeeded London Breed as president of the Board of Supervisors on June 26, 2018, following Breed's election as mayor of San Francisco. Later that year, she was elected to represent District 2 on the California State Board of Equalization.

According to the California Franchise Tax Board, Cohen's social media consulting firm, Power Forward, was suspended in March 2021 for failure to pay and file taxes.

Cohen won the 2022 election for California State Controller.

Personal life 
She married workers' compensation attorney Warren Pulley in May 2016.

Electoral history

2018

References

External links 

 Office of Chair Malia Cohen
 Campaign website

|-

|-

1977 births
20th-century African-American women
20th-century African-American people
21st-century African-American women
21st-century African-American politicians
21st-century American politicians
21st-century American women politicians
African-American city council members in California
Carnegie Mellon University alumni
Democratic Party state constitutional officers of California
Fisk University alumni
Living people
San Francisco Board of Supervisors members
State Controllers of California
Women city councillors in California